The following television stations operate on virtual channel 67 in the United States:

 KFTH-DT in Alvin, Texas
 KMBH-LD in McAllen, Texas
 KSMS-TV in Monterey, California
 KXFX-CD in Brownsville, Texas
 WBBZ-TV in Springville, New York
 WFTY-DT in Smithtown, New York
 WHVD-LD in Huntsville, Alabama
 WMPB in Baltimore, Maryland
 WPXP-TV in Lake Worth, Florida
 WUPX-TV in Richmond, Kentucky

The following television station, which is no longer licensed, formerly operated on virtual channel 67 in the United States:
 K48NY-D in Gainesville, Texas

References

67 virtual